The Democratic Republican Union (URD) is a Venezuelan political party founded in 1945.

History

When the party appeared on course to win the 1952 election for a constituent assembly, then-dictator Marcos Pérez Jiménez suspended the election. The party joined in the 1958 Puntofijo Pact, and its candidate in that year's presidential election, Wolfgang Larrazábal, was the runner-up. The party resigned from the Puntofijo Pact in 1962 in protest of the decision to exclude Cuba from the Organization of American States, which ended its time as a dominant political party. Its candidate Jóvito Villalba won 19% of the vote in the 1963 election, but only 3% in the 1973 election.

Presidential candidates supported
Elections where the URD backed the winning candidate shown in bold.

 1952 election: Jóvito Villalba
 1958 election: Wolfgang Larrazábal (34.88% of vote)
 1963 election: Jóvito Villalba (18.89%)
 1968 election: Miguel Ángel Burelli Rivas (22.22%)
 1973 election: Jóvito Villalba (3.07%)
 1978 election: Luis Herrera Campins (COPEI candidate)
 1983 election: Jaime Lusinchi (Acción Democrática candidate)
 1988 election: Ismenia Villalba (0.84%)
 1993 election: Rafael Caldera (independent, backed by a coalition of anti-COPEI/Acción Democrática parties)
 1998 election: Luis Alfaro Ucero (0.60%)
 2000 election:
 2006 election: Manuel Rosales (A New Era candidate)

References

1945 establishments in Venezuela
Liberal parties in Venezuela
Political parties established in 1945
Political parties in Venezuela